"I'm Going Down" is a song written and produced by Norman Whitfield, and performed by American soul and R&B group Rose Royce in 1976. It is from the film Car Wash and is featured on its soundtrack. In 1994, it was covered by American singer Mary J. Blige.

Rose Royce version

The Rose Royce (original) version received moderate success. It peaked at number seventy on the US Billboard Hot 100 and reached number ten on the R&B singles chart. In the film Car Wash, the song serves as a double entendre, as it complements the screen time of Maureen, a forlorn prostitute who desperately seeks a chance at true love with Joe, even as she turns tricks.

Charts

Mary J. Blige version

In 1994, American R&B singer-songwriter Mary J. Blige covered "I'm Going Down", titled "I'm Goin' Down", for her second studio album, My Life (1994). Her version was produced by Sean "Puffy" Combs and Chucky Thompson. Released as the album's second single, Blige's version peaked at number thirteen on the US Hot R&B/Hip-Hop Songs chart and number twenty-two on the US Billboard Hot 100. In mid-1995, Blige released a remix featuring Mr. Cheeks of The Lost Boyz featuring co-production from "Prince" Charles Alexander and Mark "Led" Ledford, and contains portions of "The What" (1994) by American rappers The Notorious B.I.G. and Method Man. "I'm Going Down" is frequently performed at many of Blige's concerts and as well as live sets.

Critical reception
Dave Sholin from the Gavin Report felt that "I'm Goin' Down" "offers this awesome vocalist a chance to give one of her most soulful performances. It sounds great anywhere, but it's even more incredible on the air." In his weekly UK chart commentary, James Masterton remarked that Blige "sparkles" on "a rather fabulous cover" of the old Rose Royce song. James Hamilton from the RM Dance Update described it as an "exceptional ultra soulful sparse dramatic 61.7bpm Rose Royce remake in authentic mid-Sixties slow Stax/Volt type". Jonathan Bernstein from Spin declared it as "a storming slice of down-on-my-knees, stop-start soul originally found on the Car Wash soundtrack, and you realize any previous praise for the record has been barely felt because you know the difference between the proficient material that went before and a great song. And this is a great song."

Music video
The accompanying music video for Blige's "I'm Goin' Down" was directed from January 14–15, 1995 by Matthew Rolston and was shot in black and white, with Blige as a lounge singer performing the song in a club, and wearing an-all black suit with a matching hat, walking downstairs (being duplicated over and over again). In the end, the bar patrons applaud her as she walks offstage. The video was later published on Blige's official YouTube channel in December 2009, and had generated more than 27 million views as of January 2023.

Track listings

 U.S. cassette single
 "I'm Goin' Down" (Album version) – 3:43
 "I'm Goin' Down" (Remix) – 3:48

 U.S. CD promo single – Version 1
 "I'm Goin' Down" (Album version) – 3:43
 "I'm Goin' Down" (Instrumental) – 3:44

 U.S. CD promo single – Version 2
 "I'm Goin' Down" (Album version) – 3:43
 "I'm Goin' Down" (Remix version) – 3:48
 "I'm Goin' Down" (Remix version – featuring Mr. Cheeks of Lost Boyz) – 3:49
 "I'm Goin' Down" (Remix instrumental) – 3:42
 "I'm Goin' Down" (Remix Acapella) – 3:43

 U.K. cassette single
 "I'm Goin' Down" (Album version) – 3:43
 "You Bring Me Joy" (Smoove's Soul mix) – 5:24

 U.K. CD single and U.K. 12-inch single
 "I'm Goin' Down" (Album version) – 3:43
 "You Bring Me Joy" (Smoove's Soul mix) – 5:24
 "You Bring Me Joy" (E-Smoove's Joyous Club mix) – 10:12
 "You Bring Me Joy" (Smoove Funk mix) – 4:38

 Australian CD single
 "I'm Goin' Down" (Album version) – 3:43
 "You Bring Me Joy" (E-Smoove's Joyous Club mix) – 10:12
 "You Bring Me Joy" (Smoove Funk mix) – 4:38

Credits and personnel
Credits adapted from the My Life liner notes.

Mary J. Blige – vocals
"Prince" Charles Alexander – tenor saxophone, piccolo flute, additional flute, recording engineer, mixing 
Mark "Led" Ledford – trumpet
Bruce Purse - trumpet 
Vincent Henry - alto saxophone 
Paul Pesco – guitar
Lenny Underwood – piano
Fred McFarlane - additional keyboards 
Regina Carter - violin
Diane Monroe - violin
Lesa Terry - violin
Eileen Folson - cello
Victor Bailey - bass played by 
Gloria Agostini - harp 
Kevin "K-Dog" Johnson - drums
Frank Colon - percussion

Charts

Weekly charts

Year-end charts

In popular culture
"Oh, Boy" off of Cam'ron's third album Come Home with Me samples the original Rose Royce song. Mariah Carey also sampled the song in her 2002 album Charmbracelet for the song "Boy (I Need You)".  Both songs were composed by hip-hop producer Justin "Just Blaze" Smith and are almost identical.

On the episode season 3 finale of Sister, Sister, Tamera  (Tamera Mowry) covered the song for a talent show, winning a bet that her sister Tia (Tia Mowry) had with her enemy—and Tamera's opponent, Marva.

Marcus Canty performed this song on season one of The X Factor (U.S.) during "Movie Week" and the elimination.
Megan Hilty performs the song in the "Tech" episode of Smash
Sera Hill performed the song in "Episode 5: The Blind Auditions, Part 5" episode of The Voice (U.S. season 2)
In the movie Little, Jordan and April perform the Mary J. Blige version of the song inside an upscale restaurant, with (13-year old) Jordan starting the performance while laying on a bar.
Paige Thomas performed this song as her audition for the second season of The X Factor (U.S.)
Taylor Beckham performed this song on "Episode 3: The Blind Auditions, Part 3" of The Voice (U.S. season 4)

References

1976 songs
1977 singles
1995 singles
Rose Royce songs
Mary J. Blige songs
Music videos directed by Matthew Rolston
Songs written by Norman Whitfield
Soul ballads
Song recordings produced by Norman Whitfield
Whitfield Records singles
MCA Records singles
Uptown Records singles
Black-and-white music videos
Torch songs
Songs about heartache
Rhythm and blues ballads
1970s ballads